Jean Olson "Jenny" Lanjouw (April 15, 1962 – November 1, 2005) was an American economist, economics professor at Yale University and associated professor at the University of California, Berkeley's Department of Agricultural and Resource Economics. She undertook empirical work on poverty and economic development, developed statistical tools to project poverty and inequalities at the local level, and a policy system to provide access to drugs for developing countries without violating drug manufacturers' patents.

Biography 
Jean Olson Lanjouw was born on April 15, 1962 in Seattle, Washington, to Joann and Bruce Olson. She had one brother, Eric. The family moved to Oxford, Ohio when Lanjouw was a child. She graduated summa cum laude with Bachelor of Arts (BA) degrees in mathematics and economics from Miami University. Lanjouw garnered an interest in the economics of developing countries while she was attending a year-long master's program at Delhi School of Economics in the mid-1980s. She later earned a master's degree at the London School of Economics and Political Science in 1987, and went on to achieve a doctorate at the same institution five years later.

In 1992, Lanjouw moved to Washington, D.C. and was a commuter to her position as economics professor at Yale University. She joined the faculty as associated professor at the University of California, Berkeley's Department of Agricultural and Resource Economics in July 2003. Lanjouw was a non-resident senior fellow in economic and governance studies at the Brookings Institution, a non-resident senior fellow for the Center for Global Development, and a research fellow at the National Bureau of Economic Research.

She focused her time on empirical work on poverty and economic development, on law and economics, and on the economics of changes in technology. Lanjouw studied the role of land titles in Guayaquil's urban squatter communities and emphasized their interaction to informal property rights. She developed statistical tools to combine census and detailed survey data to view poverty and inequality from either the village or neighborhood level. Lanjouw examined the effects of a requirement by the World Trade Organization to require many developing countries to introduce pharmaceutical patents, and developed a policy mechanism to create a patent system to adapt to the development of individual countries and the importance of their product markets. It would provide poor countries with access to drugs at a low cost without violating drug manufacturers' patents.

Her work was published in several multiple journals, such as The Review of Economic Studies, Econometrica, Journal of Development Economics, Harvard Journal of Law & Technology, and The Journal of Industrial Economics. Lanjouw also organized conferences on patent reform and statistics, and she consulted for the World Bank, the United Nations Development Program, and statistical organisations in South Africa and Brazil. In August 2005, she was diagnosed with renal cell cancer, and died on November 1, 2005, at her home in Washington, D.C. Services to commemorate her life were held in Washington, D.C.

Personality and personal life
Known as "Jenny" by friends and colleagues, Lanjouw was a popular individual from combining "charm, humor, and a keen sense of intellectual curiosity in her interactions." She was enthusiastic, detailed in her work, friendly with students, and treated all equally regardless of seniority. Lanjouw was married to World Bank economist Peter Lanjouw and they had two children.

Legacy
After her death, a memorial fund called the Jean O. Lanjouw Memorial Fund was established in her honor by the UC Berkeley Foundation. Her husband explained that the fund was established to ensure her work could be continued by future generations via sponsorship.

Selected publications

References

External links
 
 Jean Olson Lanjouw: Ideas

1962 births
2005 deaths
Educators from Seattle
Economists from Washington (state)
Miami University alumni
Delhi School of Economics alumni
Alumni of the London School of Economics
Yale University faculty
University of California, Berkeley faculty
American women economists
American women academics
20th-century American women
21st-century American women
20th-century American economists
21st-century American economists
Brookings Institution people
Center for Global Development
National Bureau of Economic Research